ECCO City Greens FC is a football club from Botswana based in Francistown.

Honours
Mascom Premier League: 1
2007
Coca-Cola Cup: 1
Runner-up: 2007

Current squad
Players:
Zecco 
Mmilidzi 
Makafifiri
Nicolas
Matlhare
Malepa Bolelang

Players

Reference

Football clubs in Francistown
2003 establishments in Botswana
Association football clubs established in 2003